Ricardo Daniel Ibarra (28 August 1950 – 15 December 2011) was an Argentine rower. He competed at the 1972, 1976 and 1984 Summer Olympics in single and double scull events with the best result of fifth place in the single sculls in 1984. He won this event at three consecutive Pan American Games, in 1975, 1979 and 1983. Ibarra was the flag bearer for Argentina at the 1984 Olympic Opening Ceremony and won the Olimpia Award eight times in the rowing category. After retiring from competitions he coached the national rowing team while working at the International Rowing Federation as a consultant for Latin America.

Ibarra was married to his schoolmate Nora, they had two sons.

References

1950 births
2011 deaths
Argentine male rowers
Olympic rowers of Argentina
Rowers at the 1972 Summer Olympics
Rowers at the 1976 Summer Olympics
Rowers at the 1984 Summer Olympics
Rowers from Buenos Aires
Pan American Games gold medalists for Argentina
Pan American Games medalists in rowing
Rowers at the 1975 Pan American Games
Rowers at the 1979 Pan American Games
Rowers at the 1983 Pan American Games
Medalists at the 1975 Pan American Games
Medalists at the 1979 Pan American Games
Medalists at the 1983 Pan American Games